Spiraea latifolia, commonly known as broadleaf meadowsweet, is a shrub in the family Rosaceae.  It has often been treated as a variety of Spiraea alba (white or narrowleaf meadowsweet). It is the primary host plant for Hemileuca lucina.

References

External links
Trees, Shrubs, and Woody Vines of North Carolina: Broadleaf Meadowsweet (Spiraea latifolia)
Description

latifolia